Neoascia annexa is a species of hoverfly in the family Syrphidae.

Distribution
Denmark.

References

Eristalinae
Insects described in 1776
Diptera of Europe
Taxa named by Otto Friedrich Müller